Sharon Versyp (born December 3, 1965) is an American former basketball player who is the head coach of the University of South Carolina Beaufort women's basketball team and the former head coach of the Purdue University women's basketball team from 2006 to 2021. She was Indiana's High School Miss Basketball in 1984 and an All-American at Purdue.

High school career
Versyp played basketball at Mishawaka High School in Mishawaka, Indiana from 1980 to 1984. As a senior, the 5' 9" point guard averaged 23.8 points, 4.3 rebounds and 3.8 assists while leading the team to a 24-1 record. She scored 1,189 career points and led Mishawaka to a 58-9 record in her three years as a varsity player. She was named as the ninth Indiana Miss Basketball in 1984, leading the Indiana All-Star team to two victories over rival Kentucky. An outstanding volleyball player, Versyp also led her high school volleyball team to the state finals twice, including a state championship in 1983.

Collegiate playing career
As a player, Versyp was a fixture in the Purdue starting lineup beginning her freshman year and is one of only seven four-year starters in Purdue women's basketball history. She led the team in scoring three straight seasons and still ranks fourth in single game assists (12), seventh in career assists (418) and 10th in career points (1,565). Versyp still has records in the top-10 all-time in 10 statistical categories. In 1988, Versyp was named All-Big Ten and CoSIDA All-American, and won honors as the school's women's athlete of the year. At Purdue, she led the team to three consecutive winning seasons at a time when the program had enjoyed only one winning campaign in the previous ten years of play.

High school coaching career
After graduating from Purdue, Versyp became the head coach at Lawrence North High School in Indianapolis from 1989 to 1993, taking an 0-18 team to a sectional runner-up finish in two seasons. She also served as the head coach at Benton Central Junior-Senior High School in Oxford, Indiana from 1993 to 1996.

Collegiate coaching career
Versyp entered the collegiate ranks in 1996–97, when she joined Bud Childers' staff at the University of Louisville. After going 20-9, sharing the Conference USA regular-season title and an earning NCAA berth, Childers left for James Madison University. Versyp joined him in Harrisonburg, Va., serving as his top assistant and recruiting coordinator. She was there for three seasons and in 1999 helped ink a recruiting class ranked nationally in the top 25.

Maine
In 2000, Versyp became the head coach at Maine for five seasons, where she amassed a 98-51 record, including 67-19 in America East Conference. Versyp's teams won three straight America East regular season championships (2003–05) and in 2004 also won the America East tournament title, earning an NCAA Tournament berth. Versyp was twice voted America East Coach of the Year (2003 and 2005). Her teams achieved season records of 25-6 in 2002–03 and 25-7 in 2003–04, which were the first back-to-back 25-win campaigns in school history. Under Versyp's guidance, Maine student-athletes earned America East, Rookie and Defensive Player of the year designations and garnered 15 all-conference honors in her five years with the Black Bears. Versyp coached 2003 and 2004 America East Player of the Year, Heather Ernest, who went on to play professionally overseas. While at Maine, Versyp's team ranked 13th in the Women's Basketball Coaches Association National Team Academic Honor Roll.

Indiana
Versyp took the head coaching job at Indiana University in 2005–06, where she led her team to a 19-14 season, 9-7 in the Big Ten and the quarterfinals of the post-season WNIT. The nine-game improvement was the second largest turn-around in school history for a first-year head coach. While at Indiana, Versyp guided senior Cyndi Valentin to first team All-Big Ten honors and newcomer Whitney Thomas to the Big Ten All-Freshman team.

Purdue

Versyp returned to her alma mater as Purdue's eighth head coach on April 10, 2006.

In her first year as head coach at Purdue, Versyp led the Boilermakers to a 31-6 record that included a second-place finish in the Big Ten regular season, a Big Ten tournament title and an appearance in the NCAA Elite Eight. Versyp was named the 2007 WBCA Region VI Coach of the Year for her achievements with the team.
The former Boilermaker point guard has led her team to two Big Ten tournament championships and two NCAA Tournament Elite Eight appearances in her three years as head coach. She has compiled a 75-32 record (.701 win percentage), has won over 73 percent of Purdue's Big Ten Conference regular-season games and has led the Boilermakers to the Big Ten tournament championship game each year, winning twice. For two years in a row, the Lady Boilermakers have earned a team GPA of 3.14, an improvement of nearly half a point from the academic year prior to Versyp becoming Purdue's head coach.

On March 26, 2021; Purdue announced the 2021-2022 season will be the last year of the "Versyp Era" at Purdue, with Katie Gearlds joining the Lady Boilers staff and then succeeding Versyp as the head coach after the 2021-2022 season. The Journal & Courier reported on August 18, 2021 that Purdue University was investigating allegations that  Versyp created a “toxic and hostile environment,” including verbally attacking players and bullying a member of her coaching staff. It was announced on September 16, 2021 that Versyp would be retiring and replaced by Gearlds a year earlier than originally planned.

University of South Carolina Beaufort 
On October 26, 2022, Versyp announced she would return to coaching and begin building the University of South Carolina Beaufort's new women's basketball program. The Sandsharks inaugural season takes place during the 2023-2024 season.

Honors and awards
Versyp was inducted into the New England Basketball Hall of Fame in June 2013 for her accomplishments as head coach of the University of Maine women's basketball team, where her teams won the America East championships three consecutive years.

Statistics

Purdue player
Source

Head coaching record

References

1965 births
Living people
American women's basketball players
American women's basketball coaches
Basketball coaches from Indiana
Basketball players from Indiana
High school basketball coaches in the United States
Indiana Hoosiers women's basketball coaches
James Madison Dukes women's basketball coaches
Louisville Cardinals women's basketball coaches
Maine Black Bears women's basketball coaches
People from Mishawaka, Indiana
Point guards
Purdue Boilermakers women's basketball coaches
Purdue Boilermakers women's basketball players